Lazard Ltd (formerly known as Lazard Frères & Co.) is a financial advisory and asset management firm that engages in investment banking, asset management and other financial services, primarily with institutional clients. It is the world's largest independent investment bank, with principal executive offices in New York City, Paris and London.

Lazard was founded in 1848 and operates from more than 41 cities across 26 countries in North America, Europe, Asia, Australia, and Central and South America. The firm provides advice on mergers and acquisitions, strategic matters, restructuring and capital structure, capital raising and corporate finance, as well as asset management services to corporations, partnerships, institutions, governments and individuals. In 2023, Lazard celebrates its 175th year in business.

History

Early Years
On July 12, 1848, three brothers, Alexandre Lazard, Lazare Lazard, and Simon Lazard, founded Lazard Frères & Co. as a dry goods merchant store in New Orleans, Louisiana. By 1851, Simon and two more brothers, Maurice and Elie, had all moved to San Francisco, California, while Alexandre moved to New York. Lazard Frères began to serve miners engaged in the California Gold Rush, and soon expanded into banking and foreign exchange.

In 1854, Alexandre Lazard moved to Paris, France, where he opened an office to complement the U.S. business. The firm began advising the French government on gold buying. In 1870, the firm continued to expand its international operations, opening an office in London as well.

The name "Lazard Frères" means "Lazard Brothers" or "the Brothers Lazard" in French. It refers to associations of the Lazard brothers to form various financial services institutions with world-wide offices and investments.

The Three Houses of Lazard
In the late 1800s and early 1900s, the firm evolved into three “Houses of Lazard” in the United States, France, and the United Kingdom, separately managed but allied. The Lazard partners advised clients on financial matters and built a cross-border network of high-level relationships in business and government. Noted financial advisor George Blumenthal rose to prominence as the head of the U.S. branch of Lazard Frères and was a partner of Lazard Frères in France.

In the economic boom following World War II, the American operations of Lazard expanded significantly under the leadership of the financier André Meyer. Meyer and Lazard partner Felix Rohatyn have been credited with virtually inventing the modern mergers and acquisitions (M&A) market.

In 1953, Lazard Investors Ltd began an asset management business in London, which is the origin of today's Lazard Asset Management.

A Unified Firm
In 1977, as the health of Meyer began to deteriorate, the firm came to be controlled by Michel David-Weill. Under his leadership, the three houses of Lazard were formally united in 2000 as Lazard LLC.

In 2002, David-Weill hired Bruce Wasserstein to be CEO. Lazard became a public company in 2005, with nearly two-thirds of its shares owned by current and former employees. Wasserstein became its first Chairman and CEO. In connection with the initial public offering (IPO), Lazard spun off its broker-dealer business, Lazard Capital Markets.

Following Wasserstein's death in 2009, Lazard's Board of Directors elected Kenneth M. Jacobs as Chairman and CEO.

Independence Point Advisors
Lazard invested in a startup investment bank, Independence Point Advisors, in late 2021. Independence Point Advisors was founded by Anne Clarke Wolff, previously a Bank of America executive and banker, and aspires to remain owned by women and minorities. The bank was nicknamed "Salomon Sisters" prior to its launch, in a reference to the defunct investment bank Salomon Brothers.

Business Overview

Financial Advisory
Lazard advises clients on a wide range of strategic and financial issues. These may include advising on the potential acquisition of another company, business or certain assets, or on the sale of certain businesses, assets or an entire company. The firm also advises on alternatives to a sale such as recapitalizations, spin-offs, carve-outs and split-offs. For companies in financial distress or their creditors, Lazard advises on all aspects of restructuring. The firm has advised on many of the largest restructuring assignments in the wake of the global financial crisis that began in mid-2007. Lazard also advises on capital structure and capital raising. Capital structure advice includes reviewing and analyzing structural alternatives and assisting in long-term planning. Capital raising advice includes private and public market financing. Lazard's Sovereign Advisory group advises governments and sovereign entities on policy and financial issues.

Asset Management
Lazard's asset management business provides investment management and financial advisory services to institutional clients, financial intermediaries, private clients, and investment vehicles around the world. The firm manages assets on behalf of institutional clients (corporations, labor unions, public pension funds, endowments, foundations, insurance companies, and banks; and through sub-advisory relationships, mutual fund sponsors, broker-dealers and registered advisors) and individual clients (principally family offices and high-net-worth individuals).

Office Locations

The bank operates from more than 41 cities across 26 countries.

  Amsterdam
  Beijing
  Brussels
  Bogota
  Bordeaux
  Boston
  Buenos Aires
  Charlotte
  Chicago
  Dubai
  Dublin
  Frankfurt
  Hamburg
  Munich
  Hong Kong
  Houston
  London
  Los Angeles
  Luxembourg
  Lyon
  Manama
  Madrid
  Melbourne
  México City
  Milan
  Minneapolis
  Montreal
  Nantes
  New York City
  Panama City
  Paris
  Riyadh
  San Francisco
  São Paulo
  Santiago
  Seoul
  Singapore
  Stockholm
  Sydney
  Tokyo
  Toronto
  Zürich

In Paris, the Lazard offices were located successively at 17, boulevard Poissonnière (1885-1907); 5-7, rue Pillet-Will (1907-1979); 141, boulevard Haussmann (1979-2020); and 175, boulevard Haussmann (since September 2020).

Lazard's New York City headquarters spans the top floors of 30 Rockefeller Plaza, including what used to be Room 5600, the former offices of the Rockefeller family dynasty.

Management

Past Chairmen

Alexandre Lazard, Lazare Lazard and Simon Lazard (founders)
Alexandre Weill
David David-Weill
Pierre David-Weill
André Meyer
Michel David-Weill
Ken Costa
Bruce Wasserstein

Board of Directors
Lazard's board of directors as of November 2022.
 Kenneth M. Jacobs
 Andrew Alper
 Ann-Kristin Achleitner
 Richard N. Haass
 Michelle Jarrard
 Iris Knobloch
 Philip Laskawy
 William M. Lewis, Jr
 Jane Mendillo
 Richard Parsons

Notable Current and Former Employees

Business

Politics and Public Service

Other
George J. Ames – philanthropist, former general partner of Lazard
Paul Baerwald - banker and philanthropist, Chairman of the American Jewish Joint Distribution Committee 
William D. Cohan - Contributing editor at Fortune, Award-winning author

Books

See also
 List of investment banks
 Boutique investment bank
 Lazard Station in Montreal was built in 1918 and believed to be named in their honor as the firm was responsible for financing the Mont Royal Tunnel. Renamed in 1926 as Val-Royal and demolished in 1995.

References

External links

Lazard Asset Management

Investment banks in the United States
Banks established in 1848
Financial services companies established in 1848
Companies listed on the New York Stock Exchange
1848 establishments in Louisiana
Lazard family
Multinational banks